Matthew Robinson Marks (October 29, 1834 - August 1911) was an American politician, who was the eleventh Mayor of Orlando from 1888 to 1891.

References

Mayors of Orlando, Florida
1834 births
1911 deaths
19th-century American politicians